Pierre Sané (born 1948) is the founder and president of the Imagine Africa Institute. He was UNESCO’s Assistant Director-General for Social and Human Sciences from May 2001 - June 2010. He was Secretary General of Amnesty International from October 1992 to April 2001.

Biography
Sané was born in Dakar, Senegal. For fifteen years prior to joining Amnesty International, he worked in the field of international development, serving successively as Regional Controller, International Director of Policy and Budget, and Regional Director (West and Central Africa) of the International Development Research Centre in Canada. He studied for a doctorate in Political Science at Carleton University, Ottawa, Canada, and holds an M.Sc. in Public Administration and Public Policy from the London School of Economics, as well as being a qualified chartered accountant with an MBA from the École Supérieure de Commerce et d'Administration des Entreprises of Bordeaux, France. He has published extensively on development and human rights issues. He was a founding member of the Pan-African Foundation PANAF, a non-governmental organization spanning worldwide to promote African unification; a trustee and founding member of Frontline (Dublin).
 Imagine Africa: Founder and President
 United Nations Global Compact: Member of the board and Chair of the Human Rights Working Group
 United Nations University: Member of the Advisory Committee of UNU CRIS
 West Africa Institute: Founder and Member of the Board (Praia, Cape Verde)
 Daimler-(Mercedes-Benz) Member of the Adviser Board on Integrity and Corporate Responsibility
He joined UNESCO in Paris as Assistant Director General (2001 - 2010). After retiring from the UN he taught at University of Kyoto (Japan) and University of Seoul (South Korea). 
He founded Imagine Africa Institute in 2011.

Work for IDRC
 Directed the development of the IDRC Strategy for Sub-Saharan Africa
Directed studies and research on University – Small Scale Industry Linkages in Africa with the aim of institutionalising university-productive sector linkages in the region.
 Directed studies aiming at developing a program of research on Regional Integration in West Africa.
Organised a Donors Conference on Research in Sub Saharan Africa that involved 20 funding agencies and multilateral institutions aimed at fostering collaboration among donors.
 Promoted the development of research in the region and contributed to the enhancement of a regional capacity in science and technology policy formulation, with the objective of making research an integral part of the development efforts.

Work for Amnesty International
Appointed the Secretary General of Amnesty International in October 1992, Pierre Sané was responsible for the day-to-day management of the international affairs of this human rights movement, headed the International Secretariat in London, and represented the movement to governments, international organizations and the general public. Pierre Sané had joined Amnesty International in 1988. He served as Secretary General of Amnesty International from 1992 to 2001.

In 1993 Pierre Sané led Amnesty International's delegation at the World Conference on Human Rights, and played the same role in 1995 at the UN World Conference on Women in Beijing.  He addressed the United Nations Security Council in September 1997, briefing the members on the theme of human rights and armed conflict. This was followed by a meeting with the UN Secretary-General, Kofi Annan. In both meetings, Pierre Sané stressed that attention to human rights issues can not only provide early warning of potential conflict but also enhances the chances of establishing a lasting peace. He also addressed the Permanent Council of the Organisation of American States (Washington) calling for a moratorium on the death penalty in the Americas (1998). In 1998, Pierre Sané led the worldwide campaign to mark the 50th anniversary of the Universal Declaration of Human Rights, focussing the attention of the world on the threats against human rights defenders in many countries. He presided over the Human Rights Defenders Summit in Paris in December 1998 and called on the international community to rededicate itself to the values and principles of the UDHR.

Under his leadership, Amnesty International was extensively reorganized with introduction of strategic planning, evaluation, internal audit, central fund-raising and crisis response. He recruited a new management team to adjust AI to new challenges, and initiated decentralization, opening offices in post conflict countries.

Work for UNESCO
In his capacity as Assistant Director General for the Social and Human Sciences, Pierre Sané was responsible for the development, execution and evaluation of programmes such as:
 Social Science Research and Policy (International Migration and Multicultural Policies, International cooperation in Social Sciences, Youth and Sports)
 Human Rights and Philosophy (Human Rights and Development, Gender and Women’s Rights, Racism and discrimination)
 Ethics of Science and Technology (Bioethics, Science Ethics and Ethics of the Environment)

Work for IMAGINE AFRICA
Founder and President of Imagine Africa:
Imagine Africa is a think tank dedicated to the strengthening of research policy linkages in Africa and on Africa in order to improve the quality of public policies. In particular the Institute is working at the moment to launch a new forum on Africa Asia partnership in November 2015 as part of its program on Africa and on South South emerging partnerships. A similar forum is envisaged for March 2016 on the Africa Latin America partnership. The other areas of concentration of the Institute include regional integration and decentralization in Africa. The Institute is based in Paris and Dakar.

See also 
 Amnesty International
 UNESCO
 Human rights
 African Union

References

External links
 Imagine Africa Institute

Amnesty International people
UNESCO officials
Living people
1948 births
Alumni of the London School of Economics
Carleton University alumni
Academic staff of Kyoto University
Academic staff of the University of Seoul
Senegalese activists
Senegalese officials of the United Nations